The 2017–18 Army Black Knights men's basketball team represents the United States Military Academy during the 2017–18 NCAA Division I women's basketball season. The Black Knights, led by twelfth year head coach Dave Magarity, play their home games at Christl Arena and are members of the Patriot League. They finished the season 17–14, 9–9 in Patriot League play to finish in a tie for fourth place. They advanced to the semifinals of the Patriot League women's tournament where they lost to American.

Previous season
They finished the season 22–9, 12–6 in Patriot League play to finish in third place. They advanced to the semifinals of the Patriot League women's tournament where they lost to Navy. Despite having 22 wins, they missed the postseason tournament for the first time since 2014.

Roster

Schedule

|-
!colspan=9 style=| Non-conference regular season

|-
!colspan=9 style=| Patriot League regular season

|-
!colspan=9 style=| Patriot League Women's Tournament

Rankings
2017–18 NCAA Division I women's basketball rankings

See also
2017–18 Army Black Knights men's basketball team

References

Army
Army Black Knights women's basketball seasons
Army
Army